The North Sydney Chess Club  was founded in 1908 and is one of the oldest continually existing Chess club in Australia and the Southern Hemisphere.

Biljana Dekic became the first woman to win the North Sydney Chess Club Lightning Championship in 2000 and repeated her success and won the title again in 2005.

See also

References

External links

Chess clubs in Australia
Sporting clubs in Sydney
1908 establishments in Australia
Sports clubs established in 1908
North Sydney, New South Wales